Spenser Cohen is an American film screenwriter, executive producer, and director best known for his work on Extinction (2018) and Moonfall (2022).

Career 
In March 2012, Cohen directed Diana DeGarmo's music video "Good Goodbye". Cohen began his writing career by drafting the screenplay for Extinction. In December 2013, it was revealed that the screenplay had been included in the 2013 Black List of the year's best unproduced scripts in Hollywood. In 2019, Cohen was writing the script for Moonfall. On February 21, 2019, Amblin Partners announced it had bought Cohen's script for the science fiction film Distant. In August 2021, Cohen gained notability from writing the screenplay and story for The Expendables 4. He wrote the script for the upcoming horror film Horrorscope.

Filmography

References

External links 
 

21st-century American male writers
21st-century American screenwriters
American male screenwriters
American music video directors
Living people
Place of birth missing (living people)
Year of birth missing (living people)